Showbiz Kids: The Steely Dan Story, 1972–1980 is a two-disc compilation album by Steely Dan, released in 2000. The exact same compilation (all tracks in the same sequence) was also in 2009 re-released in UK under the title The Very Best of Steely Dan.

Track listing
All songs by Walter Becker and Donald Fagen, unless otherwise noted.

Disc one

Disc two

2000 compilation albums
Steely Dan compilation albums
Albums produced by Gary Katz
MCA Records compilation albums